Dinso Road is a road in the area of Rattanakosin Island or Bangkok's old town zone.  It begins at the corner of the Giant Swing from Bamrung Mueang and Ti Thong Roads at front of the Devasathan and runs past the side of Bangkok City Hall parallel to Siriphong Road, then cuts across Ratchadamnoen Avenue at the Democracy Monument, passing Satriwittaya School and Wat Bowon Niwet School in the Banglamphu area. The road then reaches its end at the foot of Wan Chat Bridge, where it intersects with Phra Sumen Road and Prachathipatai Road, extending for a total length of .The later section has one-way traffic. 

Historically, the area around Dinso Road was home to a community of pencil-makers whose origins stretch back to the Ayutthaya period, during which the area was known as Yan Pa Dinso. Aside from a pencils, they also produced white clay fillers, which are also known in Thai as dinso.

The construction of Dinso Road began in 1898 and was completed the following year, corresponding to the reign of King Chulalongkorn (Rama V). The road was constructed in order to expand the traffic of the city, and was at the time named Ban Dinso Road. Chulalongkorn presided over the official opening ceremony on November 15, 1899.

Like other roads in the area, the modern Dinso Road is full of restaurants, bookstores, milk café, sweet shops, as well as hostels. Some of them was chosen to be Bib Gourmand from 2019 Michelin Guide as well.

References

Streets in Bangkok
Phra Nakhon district
1899 establishments in Siam